Christine Whiting Parmenter (December 21, 1877 – March 1953) was an American author.

Biography
Christine Whiting was born in Plainfield, New Jersey, on December 21, 1877, the daughter of Frederic A. Whiting and Catherine Tracy Allen.

She was a former resident of Framingham Center, Massachusetts, and moved to Colorado in 1917. She married Dr. Kenneth R. Parmenter, M.D. (d. 1939), and they had one daughter, Catherine, who married Henry C. Newell. They lived at 1208 Cheyenne Blvd., Colorado Springs, Colorado. She returned to New England in 1938.

She was an author, a writer of fiction for most of the leading magazines.

She was a member of the Authors' League of America.

She died in March 1953 and is buried at Mount Auburn Cemetery, Cambridge.

Her papers are preserved at the Denver Public Library.

Works

 1924 Jean's Winter With the Warners illustrated by Charles A. Federer
 1925 The Treasure at Shady Vale
 1927 The Unknown Port
 1927 The Real Reward illustrated by Hattie Longstreet Price
 1928 One Wide River to Cross
 1929 Silver Ribbons
 1929 The Dusty Highway
 1930 David's Star of Bethlehem
 1930 So Wise We Grow
 1932 Miss Aladdin
 1933 The Long Quest
 1933 Shining Palace
 1934 The Wind Blows West
 1935 The Kings of Beacon Hill
 1937 Swift Waters
 1937 The unknown port
 1938 I was Christabel
 1939 Stories of Courage and Devotion
 1940 As The Seed is Sown
 1941 Lights-and a star!
 1942 A golden age
 1947 Fair were the days
 1948 Stronger Than Law

References

1877 births
1953 deaths
American women writers